Lukáš Zíb (born 24 February 1977) is a Czech former professional ice hockey player.

Career 
Zíb was selected by the Edmonton Oilers in the third round (57th overall) of the 1995 NHL Entry Draft.

Zíb played in the Czech Extraliga for HC Ceske Budejovice, HC Barum Continental Zlín, HC Becherovka Karlovy Vary, Bili Tygri Liberec, BK Mlada Boleslav, HC Oceláři Třinec and HC Vítkovice in the Czech Extraliga during the 2010–11 season.

He also played in the SM-liiga for Espoo Blues, the Deutsche Eishockey Liga for SERC Wild Wings and the Russian Superleague for Torpedo Nizhny Novgorod, Molot-Prikamye Perm and Vityaz Chekhov.

Career statistics

References

External links 
 

1977 births
Living people
BK Mladá Boleslav players
Czech ice hockey defencemen
Edmonton Oilers draft picks
EHC Freiburg players
Espoo Blues players
HC Bílí Tygři Liberec players
HC Karlovy Vary players
HC Oceláři Třinec players
HC Tábor players
HC Vítkovice players
IHC Písek players
KLH Vajgar Jindřichův Hradec players
HC Vityaz players
MKS Cracovia (ice hockey) players
Molot-Prikamye Perm players
Motor České Budějovice players
PSG Berani Zlín players
Schwenninger Wild Wings players
Sportspeople from České Budějovice
Torpedo Nizhny Novgorod players
Czech expatriate ice hockey players in Finland
Czech expatriate ice hockey players in Germany
Czech expatriate ice hockey players in Russia
Czech expatriate sportspeople in Poland
Expatriate ice hockey players in Poland